Tunes of Glory is a 1960 British drama film directed by Ronald Neame, based on the 1956 novel and screenplay by James Kennaway. The film is a "dark psychological drama" focusing on events in a wintry Scottish Highland regimental barracks in the period immediately following the Second World War. It stars Alec Guinness and John Mills, featuring Dennis Price, Kay Walsh, John Fraser, Duncan MacRae, Gordon Jackson and Susannah York.

Writer Kennaway served with the Gordon Highlanders, and the title refers to the bagpiping that accompanies every important action of the battalion. The original pipe music was composed by Malcolm Arnold, who also wrote the music for The Bridge on the River Kwai. The film was generally well received by critics, the acting in particular garnering praise. Kennaway's screenplay was nominated for an Oscar.

Plot
Set in January 1948, the film opens in an officers' mess of an unnamed Highland Battalion, Jock Sinclair announces that this is his last day as acting commanding officer. The hard-drinking Sinclair, who is still only a major despite having been in command (as a brevet lieutenant colonel) since the battalion's last full colonel was killed in action during the North Africa Campaign, is to be replaced by Lieutenant Colonel  Basil Barrow. Although Sinclair led the battalion through the remainder of the war, winning a DSO as he took it "from Dover to Berlin" (He also holds an MM a medal only awarded to Other Ranks), Brigade HQ considers Barrow—whose ancestor founded the battalion—a more appropriate peacetime commanding officer.

Colonel Barrow arrives a day early and finds the officers dancing rowdily. He declines sharing a whisky with Sinclair, taking a soft drink instead. They exchange histories. Sinclair enlisted as bandsman in Glasgow and rose through the ranks, Barrow came from Oxford University. He served with the battalion in 1933. Assigned to "special duties", he  has lectured at the Royal Military Academy Sandhurst. Sinclair humorously notes that he was in Barlinnie Prison's cooler for being drunk and disorderly one night in 1933. When Sinclair presses Barrow about his war years, he replies that he, too, was "in jail". Sinclair recalls that Barrow was a prisoner of the Japanese and belittles the experience—"officers' privileges and amateur dramatics". Barrow simply replies that Barlinnie would have been preferable. At 3 am, Sinclair and Scott are drinking, alone. Sinclair reveals his frustrations and plans: "I've acted Colonel, I should be Colonel, and by God... I bloody well will be Colonel!"

Meanwhile, Morag, Sinclair's daughter, is shown secretly meeting an enlisted piper, Corporal Piper Ian Fraser.

Barrow immediately passes several orders designed to instill strict battalion discipline. Particularly resented is an order that all officers take lessons in Scottish country dancing to prepare for the cocktail party Barrow plans for Feb. 20, the first postwar official barracks party. Men who have been dancing for decades are insulted and angry at being told not to raise their arms overhead, for example. The townspeople enjoy the party, but when the dancing becomes rowdy, Barrow is infuriated. Red-faced and screaming, he ends the party. He flees in a jeep, accompanied by Capt. Cairns, in whom he confides. The thought of leading this battalion kept him alive while the Japanese drowned him repeatedly. When a sympathetic Cairns says that he triumphed and survived, Barrow replies that he did not “survive.”

Sinclair finds Corporal Fraser with Morag in a pub and punches him. "Bashing a corporal" is a severe offence, and Barrow decides to begin an inquiry, meaning a court-martial. Sinclair persuades Barrow to back down, promising support in the future. Once safe, he reneges, and other officers virtually ignore Barrow in the mess. In the billiard room, Major Charlie Scott – with glacial cruelty – says that Sinclair is really in charge and suggests that Barrow join the other acolytes. Face wet with tears, Barrow walks upstairs. Jock and others join Charlie in the billiard room. Suddenly, a gunshot echoes from upstairs. Barrow has shot himself in the tub room.

Sinclair is calm when explaining what must be done to the young officer of the day, but when he is alone, he whispers as he backs out of the room: It's not the dead body he fears, it's the ghost.

He calls a meeting to announce his plans for a grandiose funeral, "fit for a field marshal" as one man says, complete with a march through the town in which the pipers will play all the "Tunes of Glory". When one officer points to the manner of the colonel's death, Sinclair insists it was not suicide, but murder, he being the murderer and the other senior officers accomplices. While Sinclair loses himself in his vision of the cortège, all leave, except for Cairns and Scott. Sinclair disintegrates, burying his head in his tam and sobbing, "I'm fashed"!…Oh my babies. Take me home". They support him from the barracks, and Cairns rides with him as he is driven away, officers and men saluting as he passes. Bagpipes play as snow begins to fall.

Cast

 Alec Guinness as Major Jock Sinclair, DSO, MM
 John Mills as Lieutenant Colonel Basil Barrow
 Dennis Price as Major Charles Scott, MC*
 Kay Walsh as Mary Titterington
 John Fraser as Corporal Piper Ian Fraser
 Susannah York as Morag Sinclair
 Gordon Jackson as Captain Jimmy Cairns, MC
 Duncan MacRae as Pipe Major Maclean
 Percy Herbert as Regimental Sergeant Major Riddick
 Allan Cuthbertson as Captain Eric Simpson
 Paul Whitsun-Jones as Major 'Dusty' Miller
 Gerald Harper as Major Hugo MacMillan
 Richard Leech as Captain Alec Rattray
 Peter McEnery as 2nd Lieutenant David MacKinnon
 Keith Faulkner as Corporal Piper Adam
 Angus Lennie as Orderly Room Clerk
 John Harvey as Sergeant Finney
 Andrew Keir as Lance Corporal Campbell
 Jameson Clark as Sir Alan
 Lockwood West as Provost
 Ray Austin as Sergeant (uncredited)

Production
The film was initially to be made at Ealing Studios, with Michael Relph as producer and Jack Hawkins playing Sinclair. At the time that it was at Ealing, Kenneth Tynan, then working as a script reader, criticized the first draft screenplay as having "too much army-worship in it". That view was shared by director Alexander Mackendrick. By the time Kennaway rewrote the script, Ealing had lost interest and Hawkins was no longer available. The film was then picked up by the independent producer Colin Lesslie, who interested Mills in the project.

Accounts differ as to how the leading roles were cast. Mills wrote that he and Guinness "tossed for it", while Guinness recalled that he had originally been offered the role of Barrow but preferred Sinclair. The role of Barrow might have been too close to that of Colonel Nicholson in The Bridge on the River Kwai. Sinclair has been described as "anti-Nicholson".

Tunes of Glory was shot at Shepperton Studios in London. The film's sets were designed by the art director Wilfred Shingleton. Establishing location shots were done at Stirling Castle in Stirling, Scotland. Stirling Castle is the Regimental Headquarters of the Argyll and Sutherland Highlanders but in fact James Kennaway served with the Gordon Highlanders. Although the production was initially offered broad co-operation to film within the castle from the commanding officer there, as long as it didn't disrupt the regiment's [Argyll's] routine, after seeing a lurid paperback cover for Kennaway's book, that co-operation evaporated, and the production was only allowed to shoot distant exterior shots of the castle.

Director Ronald Neame worked with Guinness on The Horse's Mouth (1958), and a number of other participants were also involved in both films, including actress Kay Walsh, cinematographer Arthur Ibbetson and editor Anne V. Coates. The film was Susannah York's film debut.

Reception
Writing in Esquire, Dwight Macdonald called Tunes of Glory a "limited but satisfying tale", and wrote that "it is one of those films, like Zinnemann's Sundowners, which are of little interest cinematically and out of fashion thematically (no sex, no violence, no low life) and yet manage to be very good entertainment".

The film was praised by Bosley Crowther of The New York Times, who wrote "Not only do Alec Guinness and John Mills superlatively adorn the two top roles in this drama of professional military men, but also every actor, down to the walk-ons, acquits himself handsomely."

Variety called Ronald Neame's direction "crisp and vigorous", and said that Mills had a "tough assignment" to appear opposite Guinness, "particularly in a fundamentally unsympathetic role, but he is always a match for his co-star".

The film's screenplay, and especially the final scene showing Sinclair's breakdown, was criticised by some critics at the time of release. One critic wrote in Sight & Sound that the ending was "inexcusable" and that the scene is "far less one of tragic remorse than gauchely contrived emotionalism".

Tunes of Glory has a 73% rating on the Rotten Tomatoes review aggregation site.

Awards and honours
James Kennaway, who adapted the screenplay from his novel, was nominated for an Academy Award for Best Adapted Screenplay, but lost to Elmer Gantry. It also received numerous BAFTA nominations, including Best Film, Best British Film, Best British Screenplay and Best Actor nominations for both Guinness and Mills.

The film was the official British entry at the 1960 Venice Film Festival, and John Mills won the Best Actor award there. That same year the film was named "Best Foreign Film" by the Hollywood Foreign Press Association.

Adaptations
Tunes of Glory was adapted for BBC Radio 4's Monday Play by B.C. Cummins in April 1976.

Tunes of Glory was adapted for the stage by Michael Lunney, who directed a production of it which toured Britain in 2006.

Home video
Tunes of Glory is available on DVD from Criterion and Metrodome.  It was released on Blu-ray by Criterion in December 2019 with a 4K digital restoration.

Legacy 
Alfred Hitchcock called Tunes of Glory "one of the best films ever made", Neil Sinyard writes in The Cinema of Britain and Ireland, "so it is curious that the film rarely finds a place in the established canon of great British films". It was not included in the list of 100 greatest British films of the century compiled by the British Film Institute in 1999. Sinyard observes that the film came too late to be part of the spate of popular 1950s British war films, and was too dark to be part of that genre. He notes that it seemed "slightly old-fashioned" when compared to British New Wave films that came out at the time, such as Room at the Top.

Tunes of Glory was preserved by the Academy Film Archive in 2018.

References

External links
 
 
 
 
 Tunes of Glory an essay by Robert Murphy at the Criterion Collection

1960 films
1960 drama films
Films based on British novels
Films directed by Ronald Neame
Films set in Scotland
Films set in the 1940s
British drama films
Films scored by Malcolm Arnold
Films shot at Shepperton Studios
Films shot in Scotland
United Artists films
1960s English-language films
1960s British films